In Greek mythology, Erysichthon  (Ancient Greek: Ἐρυσίχθων), also spelled Erisichthon (lit. 'Earth-tearer') was an Athenian prince as the son of King Cecrops I of Athens and Agraulus, daughter of King Actaeus. His possible sibling were Aglaurus, Herse and Pandorus. Erysicthon died childless during his father's reign.

Mythology 
Erysichthon was said to have died in Prasiae (modern Porto Rafti), on the east coast of Attica, as he was returning from the holy island of Delos with a statue of Eileithuia, goddess of childbirth. Of the three ancient wooden images of the goddess that could be seen at her temple at Athens, one was identified as the image that Erysichthon had brought from Delos. According to Pausanias, Erysichthon's tomb could be seen at Prasiae, where his corpse was said to have been buried after his ship had arrived in port.

Notes 

Princes in Greek mythology

References 

 Apollodorus, The Library with an English Translation by Sir James George Frazer, F.B.A., F.R.S. in 2 Volumes, Cambridge, MA, Harvard University Press; London, William Heinemann Ltd. 1921. ISBN 0-674-99135-4. Online version at the Perseus Digital Library. Greek text available from the same website.
 Pausanias, Description of Greece with an English Translation by W.H.S. Jones, Litt.D., and H.A. Ormerod, M.A., in 4 Volumes. Cambridge, MA, Harvard University Press; London, William Heinemann Ltd. 1918. . Online version at the Perseus Digital Library
 Pausanias, Graeciae Descriptio. 3 vols. Leipzig, Teubner. 1903.  Greek text available at the Perseus Digital Library.

Attican characters in Greek mythology
Attic mythology